Jan Klobučar (born 11 December 1992) is a Slovenian male volleyball player. He is a member of the Slovenian national team. At club level he played for United Volleys Rhein-Main in Germany from 2015 to 2017.

Sporting achievements

National team
 2015  Men's European Volleyball League
 2015  Men's European Volleyball Championship
 2019  Men's European Volleyball Championship
 2021  Men's European Volleyball Championship

References

External links
FIVB 2016 World League Profile
World Of Volley Profile

1992 births
Living people
Sportspeople from Celje
Slovenian men's volleyball players
Slovenian expatriate sportspeople in Germany
Expatriate volleyball players in Germany
Slovenian expatriate sportspeople in Poland
Expatriate volleyball players in Poland
Slovenian expatriate sportspeople in Italy
Expatriate volleyball players in Italy
Slovenian expatriate sportspeople in France
Expatriate volleyball players in France